This is a list of the Japanese species of the superfamily Gelechioidea. It also acts as an index to the species articles and forms part of the full List of moths of Japan.

Ethmiidae
 チシャノキオオスヒロキバガ  — Ethmia assamensis (Butler, 1879)
 アトツマグロオオスヒロキバガ  — Ethmia dentata Diakonoff & Sattler, 1966
 キバラハイスヒロキバガ  — Ethmia epitrocha (Meyrick, 1914)
 イツボシスヒロキバガ  — Ethmia japonica Sattler, 1967
 トホシスヒロキバガ  — Ethmia lapidella (Walsingham, 1880)
 クロモンスヒロキバガ  — Ethmia maculifera (Matsumura, 1931)
 クロスヒロキバガ  — Ethmia nigripedella (Erschoff, 1877)
 ハラボシオオスヒロキバガ  — Ethmia nigroapicella (Saalmüller, 1880)
 ナナホシスヒロキバガ  — Ethmia septempunctata (Christoph, 1882)

Depressariidae
 ユミモンマルハキバガ  — Semioscopis japonicella Saito, 1989
 ナガユミモンマルハキバガ  — Semioscopis similis Saito, 1989
 和名未定  — Agonopterix abjectella Christoph, 1882
 和名未定  — Agonopterix acuta (Stringer, 1930)
 キガシラヒラタマルハキバガ  — Agonopterix angelicella ochrosephara Saito, 1980
 フタテンヒラタマルハキバガ  — Agonopterix bipunctifera (Matsumura, 1931)
 サンショウヒラタマルハキバガ  — Agonopterix chaetosoma Clarke, 1962
 和名未定  — Agonopterix conterminella (Zeller, 1839)
 モンシロヒラタマルハキバガ  — Agonopterix costaemaculella (Christoph, 1882)
 和名未定  — Agonopterix deltopa (Meyrick, 1935)
 ヤマウコギヒラタマルハキバガ  — Agonopterix encentra (Meyrick, 1914)
 ナガバマルハキバガ  — Agonopterix erythrella (Snellen, 1884)
 シャクノマルハキバガ  — Agonopterix heracliana (Linnaeus, 1758)
 和名未定  — Agonopterix hypericella (Hübner, 1776)
 ウラベニヒラタマルハキバガ  — Agonopterix intersecta (Filipjev, 1929)
 コクサギヒラタマルハキバガ  — Agonopterix issikii Clarke, 1962
 ウスマダラヒラタマルハキバガ  — Agonopterix japonica Saito, 1980
 ネジロマルハキバガ  — Agonopterix jezonica (Matsumura, 1931)
 チビエルモンマルハキバガ  — Agonopterix kaekeritziana (Linnaeus, 1767)
 クロクモマルハキバガ  — Agonopterix kisojiana Fujisawa, 1985
 アケボノマルハキバガ  — Agonopterix laterella ([Denis & Schiffermüller], 1775)
 クロカギヒラタマルハキバガ  — Agonopterix l-nigrum (Matsumura, 1931)
 シロホシマルハキバガ  — Agonopterix multiplicella (Erschoff, 1877)
 ヤマボクチマルハキバガ  — Agonopterix mutuurai Saito, 1980
 チャボヒラタマルハキバガ  — Agonopterix nanatella (Stainton, 1849)
 イハラマルハキバガ  — Agonopterix ocellana (Fabricius, 1775)
 ハギノマルハキバガ  — Agonopterix omelkoi Lvovsky, 1985
 イヌエンジュヒラタマルハキバガ  — Agonopterix pallidior (Stringer, 1930)
 シナノシロホシマルハキバガ  — Agonopterix pallorella (Zeller, 1839)
 ムジチャヒラタマルハキバガ  — Agonopterix phaeocausta (Meyrick, 1934)
 シノノメマルハキバガ  — Agonopterix propinquella (Treitschke, 1835)
 コチャマダラマルハキバガ  — Agonopterix rhododrosa (Meyrick, 1934)
 和名未定  — Agonopterix rimulella Caradja, 1920
 ハナウドヒラタマルハキバガ  — Agonopterix sapporensis (Matsumura, 1931)
 アズサアサギマルハキバガ  — Agonopterix selini (Heinemann, 1870)
 ヒメネジロマルハキバガ  — Agonopterix senecionis (Nickerl, 1864)
 和名未定  — Agonopterix septicella Snellen, 1884
 スミゾメマルハキバガ  — Agonopterix sumizome Fujisawa, 1985
 タカムクマルハキバガ  — Agonopterix takamukui (Matsumura, 1931)
 ヤマトマルハキバガ  — Agonopterix yamatoensis Fujisawa, 1985
 ヨモギヒラタマルハキバガ  — Agonopterix yomogiella Saito, 1980
 ミカンヒラタマルハキバガ  — Psorosticha melanocrepida Clarke, 1962
 オオクロミャクマルハキバガ  — Depressaria colossella Caradja, 1920
 クロミャクマルハキバガ  — Depressaria daucella ([Denis & Schiffermüller], 1775)
 キタグニマルハキバガ  — Depressaria filipjevi Lvovsky, 1981
 デコボコマルハキバガ  — Depressaria irregularis Matsumura, 1931
 ヨモギセジロマルハキバガ  — Depressaria leucocephala Snellen, 1884
 オシラベツマルハキバガ  — Depressaria libanotidella Schläger, 1849
 和名未定  — Depressaria nomia Butler, 1879
 ハナツヅリマルハキバガ  — Depressaria pastinacella (Duponchel, 1838)
 モトグロヒラタマルハキバガ  — Depressaria petronoma Meyrick, 1934
 チャグロマダラヒラタマルハキバガ  — Depressaria spectrocentra Meyrick, 1935
 マエジロマルハキバガ  — Depressaria taciturna Meyrick, 1910
 キマダラヒラタマルハキバガ  — Eutorna insidiosa Meyrick, 1910
 和名未定  — Eutorna leonidi Lvovsky, 1979
 シロズヒラタマルハキバガ  — Eutorna polismatica Meyrick, 1931

Elachistidae
 ヒョウタンボクモグリガ  — Perittia andoi Kuroko, 1982
 スイカズラモグリガ  — Perittia lonicerae (Zimmerman & Bradley, 1950)
 チャイロヒラタモグリガモドキ  — Perittia ochrella (Sinev, 1992)
 シロオビヒロバクサモグリガ  — Perittia unifasciella Sinev, 1992
 和名未定  — Elachista adscitella Stainton, 1851
 シロクサモグリガ  — Elachista albidella (Nylander, 1848)
 アマミノクサモグリガ  — Elachista amamii Parenti, 1983
 フタテンシロクサモグリガ  — Elachista bipunctella (Sinev & Sruoga, 1995)
 アブラススキノクサモグリガ  — Elachista caliginosa Parenti, 1983
 和名未定  — Elachista canis Parenti, 1983
 和名未定  — Elachista cingillella (Herrich-Schäffer, 1855)
 マダラクサモグリガ  — Elachista coloratella Sinev & Sruoga, 1995
 和名未定  — Elachista ermolenkoi Sinev & Sruoga, 1995
 和名未定  — Elachista exactella (Herrich-Schäffer, 1855)
 フタオビススキクサモグリガ  — Elachista fasciocaliginosa Sugisima, 2005
 和名未定  — Elachista fasciola Parenti, 1983
 和名未定  — Elachista freyerella (Hübner, [1825])
 スゲノクサモグリガ  — Elachista fulgens Parenti, 1983
 和名未定  — Elachista hiranoi Sugisima, 2005
 和名未定  — Elachista japonica (Parenti, 1983)
 和名未定  — Elachista jupiter Sugisima, 2005
 コウボウムギクサモグリガ  — Elachista kobomugi Sugisima, 1999
 チヂミザサクサモグリガ  — Elachista kurokoi Parenti, 1983
 和名未定  — Elachista latebrella Sinev & Sruoga, 1995
 和名未定  — Elachista microdigitata Parenti, 1983
 ススキクサモグリガ  — Elachista miscanthi Parenti, 1983
 和名未定  — Elachista multidentella Sinev & Sruoga, 1995
 和名未定  — Elachista nigriciliae Sugisima, 2005
 ニッポンクサモグリガ  — Elachista nipponicella Sugisima, 2006
 和名未定  — Elachista nitensella Sinev & Sruoga, 1995
 和名未定  — Elachista nozawana Sugisima, 2005
 和名未定  — Elachista paragangabella Sugisima, 2005
 クサヨシクサモグリガ  — Elachista phalaridis Parenti, 1983
 ヒラズササノクサモグリガ  — Elachista planicara Kaila, 1998
 シンセンクサモグリガ  — Elachista pusillella (Sinev & Sruoga, 1995)
 ハイイロマダラクサモグリガ  — Elachista ribentella Kaila & Varalda, 2004
 ササノクサモグリガ  — Elachista sasae Sinev & Sruoga, 1995
 ギンモンクサモグリガ  — Elachista similis Sugisima, 2005
 和名未定  — Elachista simplimorphella Sinev & Sruoga, 1995
 和名未定  — Elachista subalbidella Schläger, 1847
 ヌカボシソウモグリガ  — Elachista tengstromi Kaila, Bengtsson, Sulcs & Junnilainen, 2001
 ヤチチャマダラクサモグリガ  — Elachista utonella Frey, 1856

Parametriotidae
 ヒガシノホソエダモグリガ  — Haplochrois orientella (Sinev, 1979)
 チャイロエダモグリガ  — Blastodacna ochrella Sugisima, 2004

Deuterogoniidae
 アズミマルハキバガ  — Deuterogonia azuminensis Fujisawa, 1991
 カタキマルハキバガ  — Deuterogonia chionoxantha (Meyrick, 1931)
 カモンジマルハキバガ  — Deuterogonia kamonjii Fujisawa, 1991
 アヤメマルハキバガ  — Deuterogonia pudorina (Wocke, 1857)

Xyloryctidae
 ツガヒロバキバガ  — Metathrinca tsugensis (Kearfott, 1910)
 トガリヒロバキバガ  — Pantelamprus staudingeri Christoph, 1882

Scythrididae
 クロキヌバコガ  — Scythris palustris (Zeller, 1855)
 キガシラキヌガ  — Scythris senescens (Stainton, 1859)
 ヨツモンキヌバコガ  — Scythris sinensis (Felder & Rogenhofer, 1875)

Chimabachidae
 メスコバネマルハキバガ  — Diurnea cupreifera (Butler, 1879)
 イッシキメスコバネマルハキバガ  — Diurnea issikii Saito, 1979
 ミヤマメスコバネマルハキバガ  — Cheimophila fumida (Butler, 1879)

Schistonoeidae
 ミツモンホソキバガ  — Oecia oecophila (Staudinger, 1876)

Oecophoridae
 クロモンベニマルハキバガ  — Schiffermuelleria imogena (Butler, 1879)
 カノコマルハキバガ  — Schiffermuelleria zelleri (Christoph, 1882)
 ホソオビキマルハキバガ  — Cryptolechia malacobyrsa Meyrick, 1921
 カレハヒメマルハキバガ  — Pseudodoxia achlyphanes (Meyrick, 1934)
 スジモンキマルハキバガ  — Periacma delegata Meyrick, 1914
 ウスムジヒゲナガマルハキバガ  — Carcina homomorpha (Meyrick, 1931)
 ニセコクマルハキバガ  — Martyringa ussuriella Lvovsky, 1979
 コクマルハキバガ  — Martyringa xeraula (Meyrick, 1910)
 ホソバキホリマルハキバガ  — Casmara agronoma Meyrick, 1931
 チャノキホリマルハキバガ  — Casmara patrona Meyrick, 1925
 アカガネマルハキバガ  — Promalactis akaganea Fujisawa, 2002
 ヒメシロスジカバマルハキバガ  — Promalactis autoclina Meyrick, 1935
 シロスジベニマルハキバガ  — Promalactis enopisema (Butler, 1879)
 フジサワベニマルハキバガ  — Promalactis ermolenkoi Lvovsky, 1986
 ギンモンカバマルハキバガ  — Promalactis jezonica (Matsumura, 1931)
 ホングウギンモンマルハキバガ  — Promalactis kumanoensis Fujisawa, 2002
 マノベニマルハキバガ  — Promalactis manoi Fujisawa, 2002
 ヨスジカバマルハキバガ  — Promalactis matsuurae Fujisawa, 2002
 サカイマルハキバガ  — Promalactis sakaiella (Matsumura, 1931)
 シロスジカバマルハキバガ  — Promalactis suzukiella (Matsumura, 1931)
 ツマジロベニマルハキバガ  — Promalactis venustella (Christoph, 1882)
 ヤエヤマカバマルハキバガ  — Promalactis yaeyamaensis Fujisawa, 2002
 カレハチビマルハキバガ  — Tyrolimnas anthraconesa Meyrick, 1934
 キガシラマルハキバガ  — Pedioxestis isomorpha Meyrick, 1932
 ナニワズハリキバガ  — Anchinia cristalis (Scopoli, 1763)
 クロマイコモドキ  — Lamprystica igneola Stringer, 1930
 アイカップマルハキバガ  — Pseudatemelia josephinae (Toll, 1956)
 和名未定  — Telechrysis tripuncta (Haworth, 1828)

Stathmopodidae
 キイロマイコガ  — Stathmopoda auriferella (Walker, 1864)
 フタオビクロマイコガ  — Stathmopoda brachymochla Meyrick, 1937
 ハンノマイコガ  — Stathmopoda flavescens Kuznetzov, 1984
 カタアカマイコガ  — Stathmopoda haematosema Meyrick, 1933
 カキノヘタムシガ  — Stathmopoda masinissa Meyrick, 1906
 モトキマイコガ  — Stathmopoda moriutiella Kasy, 1973
 オビマイコガ  — Stathmopoda opticaspis Meyrick, 1931
 キイロオビマイコガ  — Stathmopoda pedella (Linnaeus, 1761)
 オオマイコガ  — Stathmopoda stimulata Meyrick, 1913
 シロテンクロマイコガ  — Atrijuglans hetaohei Yang, 1977
 クロコマイコガ  — Hieromantis kurokoi Yasuda, 1988
 和名未定  — Hieromantis makiosana Yasuda, 1988
 セグロベニトゲアシガ  — Atkinsonia ignipicta (Butler, 1881)
 アカヒゲベニトゲアシガ  — Atkinsonia leechi (Walsingham, 1889)
 和名未定  — Snellenia iginispergens Diakonoff, 1948
 和名未定  — Minomona bimaculata Matsumura, 1931

Lecithoceridae
 フタクロボシキバガ  — Scythropiodes issikii (Takahashi, 1930)
 ゴマフシロキバガ  — Scythropiodes leucostola (Meyrick, 1921)
 ムモンヒロバキバガ  — Scythropiodes lividula (Meyrick, 1932)
 フタテンヒロバキバガ  — Scythropiodes malivora (Meyrick, 1930)
 和名未定  — Scythropiodes notocapna (Meyrick, 1925)
 シロヒロバキバガ  — Scythropiodes venusta (Moriuti, 1977)
 マエチャオオヒロバキバガ  — Rhizosthenes falciformis Meyrick, 1935
 和名未定  — Homaloxestis hesperis Gozmány, 1978
 キベリハイヒゲナガキバガ  — Homaloxestis myeloxesta Meyrick, 1932
 カクバネヒゲナガキバガ  — Lecitholaxa thiodora (Meyrick, 1914)
 和名未定  — Lecithocera chersitis Meyrick, 1918
 和名未定  — Lecithocera daebuensis Park, 1999
 ムモンクロヒゲナガキバガ  — Catacreagra notolychna (Meyrick, 1936)
 イッシキヒゲナガキバガ  — Issikiopteryx japonica Moriuti, 1973
 オビカクバネヒゲナガキバガ  — Deltoplastis apostatis (Meyrick, 1932)
 クロカクバネヒゲナガキバガ  — Athymoris martialis Meyrick, 1935
 コゲチャヒゲナガキバガ  — Halolaguna sublaxata Gozmány, 1978

Batrachedridae
 コウスチャホソキバガ  — Batrachedra albicapitella Sinev, 1986
 ヤシノホソキバガ  — Batrachedra arenosella (Walker, 1864)
 ウスチャホソキバガ  — Batrachedra koreana Sinev & Park, 1994
 ウスジロホソキバガ  — Batrachedra pinicolella (Zeller, 1839)
 ヤブミョウガスゴモリキバガ  — Idioglossa polliacola Sugisima, 2000
 和名未定  — Epimarptis hiranoi Sugisima, 2004

Coleophoridae
 ヨモギケブカツツミノガ  — Coleophora albicans Zeller, 1849
 ヤナギピストルミノガ  — Coleophora albidella ([Denis & Schiffermüller], 1775)
 キンバネツツミノガ  — Coleophora alcyonipennella (Kollar, 1832)
 ヨモギハナツツミノガ  — Coleophora artemisicolella Bruand, 1854
 リンゴピストルミノガ  — Coleophora bernoulliella (Goeze, 1783)
 アザミオオツツミノガ  — Coleophora brevipalpella Wocke, 1874
 和名未定  — Coleophora burhinella Baldizzone & Oku, 1990
 カツラツツミノガ  — Coleophora cercidiphyllella Oku, 1965
 アカザハナツツミノガ  — Coleophora chenopodii Oku, 1965
 ヨモギムモンツツミノガ  — Coleophora cinclella Baldizzone & Oku, 1990
 ヒメツツミノガ  — Coleophora citrarga Meyrick, 1934
 アカミャクツツミノガ  — Coleophora cristata Baldizzone, 1989
 和名未定  — Coleophora currucipennella Zeller, 1839
 ヤチツツミノガ  — Coleophora elodella Baldizzone & Oku, 1988
 ヨモギホソツツミノガ  — Coleophora enkomiella Baldizzone & Oku, 1988
 フタイロツツミノガ  — Coleophora eteropennella Baldizzone & Oku, 1988
 和名未定  — Coleophora falkovitshella Vives Moreno, 1984
 キミャクツツミノガ  — Coleophora flavovena Matsumura, 1931
 ハンノキツツミノガ  — Coleophora hancola Oku, 1965
 ヨモギオオツツミノガ  — Coleophora honshuella Baldizzone & Oku, 1988
 ノコンギクハナツツミノガ  — Coleophora hsiaolingensis Toll, 1942
 ウスシロミャクツツミノガ  — Coleophora issikii Baldizzone & Oku, 1988
 ニレナガツツミノガ  — Coleophora japonicella Oku, 1965
 コウガイゼキショウツツミノガ  — Coleophora juncivora Baldizzone & Oku, 1990
 ユウガギクハナツツミノガ  — Coleophora kamtschatica (Anikin, 1998)
 ゴマフツツミノガ  — Coleophora kudrosella Baldizzone & Oku, 1988
 キクツツミノガ  — Coleophora kurokoi Oku, 1974
 和名未定  — Coleophora laniella Baldizzone & Oku, 1990
 和名未定  — Coleophora laricella (Hübner, [1817])
 イソツツジツツミノガ  — Coleophora ledi Stainton, 1860
 ナラツツミノガ  — Coleophora levantis Baldizzone & Oku, 1988
 シラヤマギクツツミノガ  — Coleophora linosyridella Fuchs, 1880
 ヒメキンバネツツミノガ  — Coleophora mayrella (Hübner, [1813])
 カシワピストルミノガ  — Coleophora melanographa Meyrick, 1935
 カンバマエジロツツミノガ  — Coleophora milvipennis Zeller, 1839
 ノギククロツツミノガ  — Coleophora molothrella Baldizzone & Oku, 1988
 コケモモツツミノガ  — Coleophora murinella Tengström, 1847
 サクラツツミノガ  — Coleophora neviusiella Busck, 1904
 カラマツツツミノガ  — Coleophora obducta (Meyrick, 1931)
 和名未定  — Coleophora okuella Baldizzone & Savenkov, 2002
 シラカバピストルミノガ  — Coleophora platyphyllae Oku, 1965
 ノギクギンオビツツミノガ  — Coleophora pseudoditella Baldizzone & Patzak, 1983
 ミヤマピストルミノガ  — Coleophora quercicola Baldizzone & Oku, 1990
 アカザフシガ  — Coleophora serinipennella Christoph, 1872
 シラカバツツミノガ  — Coleophora serratella (Linnaeus, 1761)
 リンゴツツミノガ  — Coleophora spinella (Schrank, 1802)
 アカザウスグロツツミノガ  — Coleophora sternipennella (Zetterstedt, 1839)
 シロミャクツツミノガ  — Coleophora therinella Tengström, 1848
 和名未定  — Coleophora trifolii (Curtis, 1832)
 ニレコツツミノガ  — Coleophora ulmivorella Oku, 1965
 アズキナシツツミノガ  — Coleophora uniformis Oku, 1965
 アオビユツツミノガ  — Coleophora versurella Zeller, 1849
 シモフリツツミノガ  — Coleophora vestianella (Linnaeus, 1758)
 アキノキリンソウツツミノガ  — Coleophora virgaureae Stainton, 1857
 ヨモギツツミノガ  — Coleophora yomogiella Oku, 1974

Momphidae
 ハイイロアカバナキバガ  — Mompha glaucella Sinev, 1986
 エゾフジアカバナキバガ  — Cyphophora minorella Sinev, 1993
 アカガネアカバナキバガ  — Psacaphora locupletella ([Denis & Schiffermüller], 1775)
 クロガネアカバナキバガ  — Psacaphora ludwigiae (Bradley, 1973)

Blastobasidae
 シロジネマルハキバガ  — Hypatopa montivaga Moriuti, 1982
 イノウエネマルハキバガ  — Blastobasis inouei Moriuti, 1987
 コネマルハキバガ  — Blastobasis sprotundalis Park, 1984
 オオネマルハキバガ  — Neoblastobasis biceratala (Park, 1984)
 和名未定  — Neoblastobasis brevicornis Moriuti, 1987
 ウスオビネマルハキバガ  — Neoblastobasis decolor (Meyrick, 1907)
 ウスイロネマルハキバガ  — Neoblastobasis spiniharpella Kuznetzov & Sinev, 1985
 和名未定  — Holcocera sakura Ohshima, 2003

Autostichidae
 和名未定  — Autosticha imitativa Ueda, 1997
 ヒマラヤスギキバガ  — Autosticha kyotensis (Matsumura, 1931)
 ミツボシキバガ  — Autosticha modicella (Christoph, 1882)
 クロボシキバガ  — Autosticha pachysticta (Meyrick, 1936)
 ヨツモンキバガ  — Autosticha tetragonopa (Meyrick, 1935)
 和名未定  — Autosticha truncicola Ueda, 1997

Peleopodidae
 ネズミエグリヒラタマルハキバガ  — Acria ceramitis Meyrick, 1908
 オオエグリヒラタマルハキバガ  — Acria emarginella (Donovan, 1806)

Cosmopterigidae
 ヒメクロボシトガリホソガ  — Syntomaula cana Moriuti, 1977
 オオクロボシトガリホソガ  — Syntomaula simulatella (Walker, 1864)
 アシブサトガリホソガ  — Ashibusa jezoensis Matsumura, 1931
 ホソカザリバ  — Cosmopterix attenuatella (Walker, 1864)
 カザリバ  — Cosmopterix fulminella Stringer, 1930
 和名未定  — Cosmopterix gracilis Sinev, 1985
 ナガカザリバ  — Cosmopterix infundibulella Sinev
 和名未定  — Cosmopterix kurilensis Sinev, 1985
 オオウスオビカザリバ  — Cosmopterix laetificoides Sinev, 1993
 ヨシウスオビカザリバ  — Cosmopterix lienigiella Lienig & Zeller, 1846
 ドルリーカザリバ  — Cosmopterix orichalcea Stainton, 1861
 マダケカザリバ  — Cosmopterix phyllostachysea Kuroko, 1975
 コカザリバ  — Cosmopterix rhyncognathosella Sinev, 1985
 サッポロカザリバ  — Cosmopterix sapporensis (Matsumura, 1931)
 マメカザリバ  — Cosmopterix schmidiella Frey, 1856
 ヨシカザリバ  — Cosmopterix scribaiella japonica Kuroko, 1960
 ヒメカザリバ  — Cosmopterix setariella Sinev, 1985
 ススキキオビカザリバ  — Cosmopterix sublaetifica Kuroko, 1982
 ウスイロカザリバ  — Cosmopterix victor Stringer, 1930
 カラムシカザリバ  — Cosmopterix zieglerella (Hübner, [1810])
 フサヒゲトガリホソガ  — Labdia antennella Sinev & Park, 1994
 オオツマキトガリホソガ  — Labdia bicolorella (Snellen, 1884)
 ツマキトガリホソガ  — Labdia citracma (Meyrick, 1915)
 セジロトガリホソガ  — Labdia issikii Kuroko, 1982
 ギンスジトガリホソガ  — Labdia niphosticta (Meyrick, 1936)
 ベニモントガリホソガ  — Labdia semicoccinea (Stainton, 1859)
 和名未定  — Labdia stagmatophorella Sinev, 1993
 クロギンスジトガリホソガ  — Ressia quercidentella Sinev, 1991
 タテスジトガリホソガ  — Pyroderces sarcogypsa (Meyrick, 1932)
 和名未定  — Anatrachyntis incertulella (Walker, 1864)
 マダラトガリホソガ  — Anatrachyntis japonica Kuroko, 1982
 トウモロコシトガリホソガ  — Anatrachyntis rileyi (Walsingham, 1882)
 ガマトガリホソガ  — Limnaecia phragmitella Stainton, 1851
 タコノキトガリホソガ  — Trissodoris honorariella (Walsingham, 1907)
 キオビキバガ  — Macrobathra quercea Moriuti, 1973
 ベニモンマイコモドキ  — Pancalia hexachrysa (Meyrick, 1935)
 ギンモンマイコモドキ  — Pancalia isshikii Matsumura, 1931

Gelechiidae
 グミハモグリキバガ  — Apatetris elaeagnella Sakamaki, 2000
 ハマニンニクキバガ  — Apatetris elymicola Sakamaki, 2000
 ソバカスキバガ  — Gelechia acanthopis Meyrick, 1932
 ナラクロテンキバガ  — Gelechia anomorcta Meyrick, 1926
 ゴマダラハイキバガ  — Gelechia cuneatella Douglas, 1852
 和名未定  — Gelechia fuscooculata Omelko
 ヤナギウスグロキバガ  — Gelechia inconspicua Omelko, 1986
 和名未定  — Gelechia tragicella (Heyden, 1865)
 ミツコブキバガ  — Psoricoptera gibbosella (Zeller, 1839)
 和名未定  — Psoricoptera kawabei Park & Karsholt, 1999
 クルミミツコブキバガ  — Psoricoptera latignathosa Park & Karsholt, 1999
 和名未定  — Psoricoptera speciosella Teich, 1983
 和名未定  — Psoricoptera triorthias (Meyrick, 1935)
 ミヤマシモフリキバガ  — Chionodes continuella (Zeller, 1839)
 ミヤマシロオビキバガ  — Chionodes viduella (Fabricius, 1794)
 ミヤマオオクロキバガ  — Neofaculta taigana Ponomarenko, 1988
 シロクロキバガ  — Recurvaria comprobata (Meyrick, 1935)
 ナラクロオビキバガ  — Nuntia incognitella (Caradja, 1920)
 イブキチビキバガ  — Stenolechia bathrodyas Meyrick, 1935
 アカマツチビキバガ  — Stenolechia kodamai Okada, 1962
 ゴマダラシロチビキバガ  — Stenolechia notomochla Meyrick, 1935
 シロホソハネキバガ  — Stenolechia rectivalva Kanazawa, 1984
 ツシマチビキバガ  — Stenolechia robusta Kanazawa, 1984
 ウロコホソハネキバガ  — Stenolechia squamifera Kanazawa, 1984
 マツノクロボシキバガ  — Exoteleia dodecella (Linnaeus, 1758)
 和名未定  — Parastenolechia gracilis Kanazawa, 1991
 イッシキチビキバガ  — Parastenolechia issikiella (Okada, 1961)
 和名未定  — Angustialata gemmellaformis Omelko, 1988
 和名未定  — Piskunovia reductionis Omelko, 1986
 和名未定  — Protoparachronistis concolor Omelko, 1999
 和名未定  — Protoparachronistis discedens Omelko, 1986
 和名未定  — Protoparachronistis policapitis Omelko, 1986
 和名未定  — Parachronistis fumea Omelko
 和名未定  — Parachronistis incerta Omelko
 カクモンハイイロヒメキバガ  — Parachronistis jiriensis Park, 1985
 ゴマダラヒメキバガ  — Parachronistis maritima Omelko, 1986
 ハイイロゴマダラヒメキバガ  — Chorivalva bisaccula Omelko, 1988
 ウスグロゴマダラヒメキバガ  — Chorivalva usisaccula Omelko, 1988
 キンバネチビキバガ  — Sinevia temulenta Omelko, 1998
 ジャガイモキバガ  — Phthorimaea operculella (Zeller, 1873)
 クロマダラコキバガ  — Caryocolum junctellum (Douglas, 1851)
 ユウヤミキバガ  — Caryocolum pullatellum (Tengström, 1848)
 ウスグロコキバガ  — Euscrobipalpa artemisiella (Treitschke, 1833)
 ハマアカザキバガ  — Euscrobipalpa atriplicella (Fischer von Röslerstamm, 1841)
 和名未定  — Euscrobipalpa caryocoloides (Povolný, 1977)
 マダラコキバガ  — Euscrobipalpa japonica (Povolný, 1977)
 和名未定  — Euscrobipalpa kurokoi (Povolný, 1977)
 和名未定  — Euscrobipalpa synurella (Povolný, 1977)
 ヒヨドリジョウゴキバガ  — Ergasiola ergasima (Meyrick, 1916)
 ゴマシオコキバガ  — Scrobipalpula japonica Povolný, 2000
 ゴマダラウスチャキバガ  — Teleiodes bradleyi Park, 1992
 ワタナベクロオビキバガ  — Teleiodes linearivalvata (Moriuti, 1977)
 キボシキバガ  — Teleiodes orientalis Park, 1992
 ヤチヤナギキバガ  — Teleiodes paripunctella (Thunberg, 1794)
 ニセナラクロオビキバガ  — Teleiodes pekunensis Park, 1993
 和名未定  — Teleiodes vulgella ([Denis & Schiffermüller], 1775)
 ネジロナカグロキバガ  — Carpatolechia daehania (Park, 1993)
 ウスクロオビキバガ  — Carpatolechia digitilobella (Park, 1992)
 ニセキボシクロキバガ  — Carpatolechia flavipunctatella (Park, 1992)
 クロホシハイキバガ  — Carpatolechia proximella (Hübner, 1796)
 ナラウスオビキバガ  — Carpatolechia quercicola (Park, 1992)
 キボシクロキバガ  — Carpatolechia yangyangensis (Park, 1992)
 ゴマフキイロキバガ  — Pseudotelphusa acrobrunella Park, 1992
 ウスクロテンシロキバガ  — Pseudotelphusa alburnella (Zeller, 1839)
 ズマダラハイキバガ  — Pseudotelphusa fugitivella (Zeller, 1839)
 クロオビハイキバガ  — Telphusa nephomicta Meyrick, 1932
 イシガケモンハイイロキバガ  — Altenia inscriptella (Christoph, 1882)
 ダイセツキバガ  — Altenia perspersella (Wocke, 1862)
 オオトガリキバガ  — Metzneria inflammatella (Christoph, 1882)
 ゴボウトガリキバガ  — Metzneria lappella (Linnaeus, 1758)
 ギンボシアカガネキバガ  — Argolamprotes micella ([Denis & Schiffermüller], 1775)
 ウスキマダラキバガ  — Monochroa cleodora (Meyrick, 1935)
 ヒメキマダラキバガ  — Monochroa cleodoroides Sakamaki, 1994
 サクラソウキバガ  — Monochroa conspersella (Herrich-Schäffer, 1854)
 アヤメキバガ  — Monochroa divisella (Douglas, 1850)
 ホーニッヒチャマダラキバガ  — Monochroa hornigi (Staudinger, 1883)
 ミゾソバキバガ  — Monochroa japonica Sakamaki, 1996
 クマタシラホシキバガ  — Monochroa kumatai Sakamaki, 1996
 ウスイロフサベリキバガ  — Monochroa leptocrossa (Meyrick, 1926)
 キモンキバガ  — Monochroa lucidella (Stephens, 1834)
 マエチャキバガ  — Monochroa pallida Sakamaki, 1996
 イツボシマダラキバガ  — Monochroa pentameris (Meyrick, 1931)
 ニセイグサキバガ  — Monochroa subcostipunctella Sakamaki, 1996
 イグサキバガ  — Monochroa suffusella (Douglas, 1850)
 エゾキバガ  — Apodia bifractella (Duponchel, [1843])
 和名未定  — Daltopora sinanensis Sakamaki, 1995
 ヘルマンアカザキバガ  — Chrysoesthia drurella (Fabricius, 1775)
 イノコズチキバガ  — Chrysoesthia heringi (Kuroko, 1961)
 ムツモンアカザキバガ  — Chrysoesthia sexguttella (Thunberg, 1794)
 キモンアカガネキバガ  — Eulamprotes atrella ([Denis & Schiffermüller], 1775)
 和名未定  — Eulamprotes wilkella (Linnaeus, 1758)
 バクガ  — Sitotroga cerealella (Olivier, 1789)
 サクラキバガ  — Anacampsis anisogramma (Meyrick, 1927)
 ツツジキバガ  — Anacampsis lignaria (Meyrick, 1926)
 ミズナラキバガ  — Anacampsis mongolicae Park, 1988
 コナラキバガ  — Anacampsis okui Park, 1988
 ポプラキバガ  — Anacampsis populella (Clerck, 1759)
 シロオビクロキバガ  — Anacampsis solemnella (Christoph, 1882)
 カンバシモフリキバガ  — Anacampsis triangulella Park, 1988
 クロチビキバガ  — Aproaerema anthyllidella (Hübner, [1813])
 マエジロキバガ  — Sophronia chilonella (Treitschke, 1833)
 チャマダラキバガ  — Bryotropha mundella (Douglas, 1850)
 ニセチャマダラキバガ  — Bryotropha similis (Stainton, 1854)
 ハイマダラキバガ  — Bryotropha svenssoni Park, 1984
 シロテンクロキバガ  — Aroga gozmanyi Park, 1991
 シロモンクロキバガ  — Aroga mesostrepta (Meyrick, 1932)
 ツマキキバガ  — Aulidiotis bicolor Moriuti, 1977
 ミドリチビキバガ  — Aristotelia citrocosma Meyrick, 1906
 和名未定  — Aristotelia incitata Meyrick, 1918
 和名未定  — Stegasta abdita Park & Omelko, 1994
 チェジュキバガ  — Stegasta jejuensis Park & Omelko, 1994
 ハギノシロオビキバガ  — Evippe albidorsella (Snellen, 1884)
 セジロチビキバガ  — Evippe syrictis (Meyrick, 1936)
 カドホシキバガ  — Photodotis adornata Omelko
 クロカドホシキバガ  — Photodotis palens Omelko
 ツマスジキバガ  — Thiotricha attenuata Omelko, 1993
 カギツマウススジキバガ  — Thiotricha celata Omelko, 1993
 カギツマフトオビキバガ  — Thiotricha corylella Omelko, 1993
 カギツマクロキバガ  — Thiotricha fusca Omelko, 1993
 カギツマウスチャキバガ  — Thiotricha indistincta Omelko, 1993
 カギツマシマキバガ  — Thiotricha obliquata (Matsumura, 1931)
 ヤマモモキバガ  — Thiotricha pancratiastis Meyrick, 1921
 スジウスキキバガ  — Thiotricha pontifera Meyrick, 1932
 クロバイキバガ  — Thiotricha prunifolivora Ueda & Fujiwara, 2005
 ウステンキバガ  — Thiotricha subocellea (Stephens, 1834)
 カギツマスジキバガ  — Thiotricha synodonta Meyrick, 1936
 クルミシントメキバガ  — Thiotricha trapezoidella (Caradja, 1920)
 和名未定  — Thiotricha tylephora Meyrick, 1935
 モンギンホソキバガ  — Thyrsostoma pylartis (Meyrick, 1908)
 ギンチビキバガ  — Cnaphostola angustella Omelko, 1984
 フタイロギンチビキバガ  — Cnaphostola biformis Omelko, 1984
 ツマモンギンチビキバガ  — Cnaphostola venustalis Omelko, 1984
 ウスツヤキバガ  — Xystophora psammitella (Snellen, 1884)
 ヘリグロウスキキバガ  — Brachmia dimidiella ([Denis & Schiffermüller], 1775)
 ウスヅマスジキバガ  — Cymotricha japonicella (Zeller, 1877)
 タテジマキバガ  — Helcystogramma arotraeum (Meyrick, 1894)
 和名未定  — Helcystogramma claripunctellum Ponomarenko, 1998
 ヘリグロタテジマキバガ  — Helcystogramma fuscomarginatum Ueda, 1995
 和名未定  — Helcystogramma perelegans (Omelko & Omelko, 1999)
 イモキバガ  — Helcystogramma triannulellum (Herrich-Schäffer, 1854)
 コフサキバガ  — Dichomeris acuminata (Staudinger, 1876)
 ウスイロフサキバガ  — Dichomeris anisacuminata Li & Zheng, 1996
 オオフサキバガ  — Dichomeris atomogypsa (Meyrick, 1932)
 コクロフサキバガ  — Dichomeris beljaevi (Ponomarenko, 1998)
 コゲチャオオフサキバガ  — Dichomeris chinganella (Christoph, 1882)
 クルミオオフサキバガ  — Dichomeris christophi Ponomarenko & Mey, 2002
 コカバフサキバガ  — Dichomeris consertella (Christoph, 1882)
 ヒメフサキバガ  — Dichomeris ferruginosa Meyrick, 1913
 モンフサキバガ  — Dichomeris harmonias Meyrick, 1922
 カバイロキバガ  — Dichomeris heriguronis (Matsumura, 1931)
 オドリキバガ  — Dichomeris hoplocrates (Meyrick, 1932)
 セグロフサキバガ  — Dichomeris horoglypta Meyrick, 1932
 イッシキオオフサキバガ  — Dichomeris issikii (Okada, 1961)
 和名未定  — Dichomeris junisonis Matsumura, 1931
 ハギフサキバガ  — Dichomeris lespedezae Park, 1994
 ミニフサキバガ  — Dichomeris minutia Park, 1994
 和名未定  — Dichomeris mitteri Park, 1994
 フジフサキバガ  — Dichomeris oceanis Meyrick, 1920
 ビワフサキバガ  — Dichomeris ochthophora Meyrick, 1936
 キイロオオフサキバガ  — Dichomeris okadai (Moriuti, 1982)
 ウスボシフサキバガ  — Dichomeris praevacua Meyrick, 1922
 ウスグロキバガ  — Dichomeris rasilella (Herrich-Schäffer, 1854)
 ウスアミメフサキバガ  — Dichomeris sparsella (Christoph, 1882)
 和名未定  — Dichomeris syndyas Meyrick, 1926
 ムモンフサキバガ  — Dichomeris tostella Stringer, 1930
 カバオオフサキバガ  — Dichomeris ustalella (Fabricius, 1794)
 クロヘリキバガ  — Mesophleps albilinella (Park, 1990)
 Mesophleps bifidella H.H. Li & Sattler, 2012
 ヘリクロモンキイロキバガ  — Athrips nigricostella (Duponchel, 1842)
 ホシウンモンキバガ  — Athrips polymaculella Park, 1991
 シロノコメキバガ  — Hypatima excellentella Ponomarenko, 1991
 マエモンノコメキバガ  — Hypatima rhomboidella (Linnaeus, 1758)
 ウスアトベリキバガ  — Hypatima spathota (Meyrick, 1913)
 マエウスノコメキバガ  — Hypatima venefica Ponomarenko, 1991
 チャモンシロキバガ  — Ethmiopsis catarina (Ponomarenko, 1994)
 ニセクロクモシロキバガ  — Ethmiopsis subtegulifera (Ponomarenko, 1994)
 クロクモシロキバガ  — Ethmiopsis tegulifera (Meyrick, 1932)
 カラコギカエデキバガ  — Faristenia acerella Ponomarenko, 1993
 ウスチャバネノコメキバガ  — Faristenia atrimaculata Park, 1993
 ハイイロマダラノコメキバガ  — Faristenia furtumella Ponomarenko, 1991
 クロモンノコメキバガ  — Faristenia geminisignella Ponomarenko, 1991
 カワリノコメキバガ  — Faristenia jumbongae Park, 1993
 ニセクロモンノコメキバガ  — Faristenia kanazawai Ueda & Ponomarenko, 2000
 ムクロジハオリノコメキバガ  — Faristenia mukurossivora Ueda & Ponomarenko, 2000
 オメルコクロノコメキバガ  — Faristenia omelkoi Ponomarenko, 1991
 ゴマダラノコメキバガ  — Faristenia quercivora Ponomarenko, 1991
 ウスリーノコメキバガ  — Faristenia ussuriella Ponomarenko, 1991
 ホシウスジロキバガ  — Dendrophilia albidella (Snellen, 1884)
 マメキバガ  — Dendrophilia leguminella Ponomarenko, 1993
 ナカオビキバガ  — Dendrophilia mediofasciana (Park, 1991)
 ツチイロキバガ  — Dendrophilia neotaphronoma Ponomarenko, 1993
 ハイイロチビキバガ  — Dendrophilia petrinopis (Meyrick, 1935)
 和名未定  — Dendrophilia saxigera (Meyrick, 1931)
 ハイジロオオキバガ  — Tornodoxa tholochorda Meyrick, 1921
 フタモンキバガ  — Anarsia bimaculata Ponomarenko, 1989
 フタクロモンキバガ  — Anarsia bipinnata (Meyrick, 1932)
 コマエモンハイキバガ  — Anarsia incerta Ueda, 1997
 ヒメマエモンハイキバガ  — Anarsia isogona Meyrick, 1913
 マエモンハイキバガ  — Anarsia protensa Park, 1995
 モンハイジロキバガ  — Anarsia silvosa Ueda, 1997
 チャイロスジキバガ  — Anarsia tortuosa (Meyrick, 1913)
 ワモンキバガ  — Bagdadia claviformis (Park, 1993)
 和名未定  — Bagdadia gnomia (Ponomarenko, 1995)
 ムクロジキバガ  — Bagdadia sapindivora (Clarke, 1958)
 ワタアカミムシガ  — Pectinophora gossypiella (Saunders, 1844)
 オキナワセンダンキバガ  — Paralida okinawensis Ueda, 2005
 センダンキバガ  — Paralida triannulata Clarke, 1958
 ズグロキバガ  — Holcophoroides nigriceps Matsumura, 1931

G